Charlotte Lennox, née Ramsay (c. 1729 – 4 January 1804), was a Scottish novelist, playwright, poet, translator, essayist, and magazine editor, who has primarily been remembered as the author of The Female Quixote, and for her association with Samuel Johnson, Joshua Reynolds and Samuel Richardson. However, she had a long, productive career in her own right.

Life
Charlotte Lennox was born in Gibraltar. Her father, James Ramsay of Dalhousie, was a Scottish captain in the British Army, and her mother Catherine, née Tisdall (died 1765), was Scottish and Irish. She was baptised Barbara Charlotte Ramsay. Very little direct information on her pre-public life is available, and biographers have extrapolated from her first novel such elements as seem semi-autobiographical. Charlotte lived for the first ten years her life in England before her father, who was a lieutenant in the guards, moved the family to Albany, New York in 1738, where he was lieutenant-governor. He died in 1742.

Lennox's experiences in the colonies probably inspired her first and last novels, Harriot Stuart (1750) and Euphemia (1790). Around the age of 13, she was sent to be a companion to her maternal aunt Mary Lucking in London, but on her arrival she found that the son of her future guardian had died and the arrangement was no longer suitable. Instead, Charlotte became a companion to Lady Isabella Finch, whose attention had been caught by Lennox's writings.

Lennox's first volume of poetry, Poems on Several Occasions, published in 1747, was dedicated to Lady Isabella and centred partly on themes of female friendship and independence. She might have been offered a position at court, but this was forestalled by her marriage to Alexander Lennox, and her decision to take up acting and to publish her works (and thereby earn her own income). Her husband's only known employment was in the customs office from 1773 to 1782, and this was reported to be as a benefice of the Duke of Newcastle as a reward for his wife. He also claimed to be the proper heir to the Earl of Lennox in 1768, but the House of Lords rejected his claims, possibly on the basis of bastardy. Charlotte mentioned his "birth misfortunes" in a letter.

Beginning in 1746 at age 17, Lennox turned her attention to acting, taking on a public role for the first time after turning away from a life in aristocratic patronage. She performed in a series of "civic" dramas of varying popularity at Drury Lane dealing with social issues of politics and gender. After the publication of her first poems, she began to shift away from acting towards writing, though she appeared in a performance at Richmond in 1748 and received a benefit night at the Haymarket Theatre in a production of The Mourning Bride in 1750. In the latter year, she also published her most successful poem, "The Art of Coquetry" in Gentleman's Magazine. She met Samuel Johnson around that time and he held her in high regard. When her first novel, The Life of Harriot Stuart, Written by Herself, appeared, Johnson threw a lavish party for Lennox, with a laurel wreath and an apple pie that contained bay leaf. Johnson thought her superior to his other female literary friends, Elizabeth Carter, Hannah More, and Frances Burney, due to her efforts to professionalize her writing career, rather than write anonymously. He ensured that Lennox was introduced to important members on the London literary scene.

However, the women of Johnson's circle were not fond of Lennox. Hester Thrale, Elizabeth Carter, and Lady Mary Wortley Montagu, all members of the Bluestocking Society, faulted her either for her housekeeping (which even Lennox joked about), for her ostensibly unpleasant personality, or for her bad temper. They saw her specifically as an incendiary.

Samuel Richardson and Samuel Johnson both reviewed Lennox's second, most successful novel, The Female Quixote, or, The Adventures of Arabella. Henry Fielding praised it in his Covent Garden Journal and it gained some popularity. It was reprinted and packaged in a series of great novels in 1783, 1799, and 1810, and translated into German in 1754, French in 1773 and 1801, and Spanish in 1808. The novel formally inverts Don Quixote: as the Don mistakes himself for the knightly hero of a romance, so Arabella mistakes herself for the maiden love of a romance. While the 
Don thinks it his duty to praise the platonically pure damsels he meets (such as the farm girl he loves), so Arabella believes it is in her power to kill with a look and that her lovers have a duty to suffer ordeals on her behalf.

The Female Quixote was officially anonymous and technically unrecognised until after Lennox's death. The anonymity was an open secret, though, as her other works were advertised as being by "the author of The Female Quixote", but no published version of The Female Quixote bore her name in her lifetime. The translator/censor of the Spanish version, Lt-Col. Don Bernardo María de Calzada, appropriated the text, stating "written in English by an unknown author and in Spanish by D. Bernardo," even though he was not fluent in English and had only translated into Spanish a previous French translation, which was already censored. In the preface, de Calzada also warns the reader of the questionable quality of the text, as good British texts were only written by "Fyelding"  and Richardson, the two authors of international fame, in contrast to the often mechanical "romances" produced by various names like Edmund Curll's or the satirical romances under one-off pseudonyms that were not primarily novels.

Joseph Baretti taught Lennox Italian, and several people helped her translate The Greek Theatre of Father Brumoy, the most influential French study of Greek tragedy in the mid-18th century. In 1755 she translated Memoirs of Maximilian de Bethune, Duke of Sully, which sold well. Learning several languages, Charlotte Lennox took an interest in the sources for William Shakespeare's plays. In 1753, the first two volumes of Shakespear Illustrated – seen by many scholars as the first feminist work of literary criticism – were published by Andrew Millar, and the third volume appeared in 1754. In this feminist literary criticism, Lennox discusses Shakespeare's sources extensively, and is especially attentive to the romance tradition on which Shakespeare drew. Her main criticism is that his plays strip female characters of their original authority, "taking from them the power and the moral independence which the old romances and novels had given them."

Samuel Johnson wrote the dedication for the work, but others criticized its treatment, in David Garrick's words, by "so great and so Excellent an Author." Though Johnson's patronage protected her reputation in print, the literary world took its revenge upon the presentation of her play, The Sister, based on her third novel, Henrietta. Several groups of attendees concerted to boo the play off the stage on its opening night, though it went on to several editions in print.

Her third novel, Henrietta, appeared in 1758 and sold well, but did not bring her any money. From 1760 to 1761 she wrote for the periodical The Lady's Museum material that would eventually comprise her 1762 novel Sophia. David Garrick produced her Old City Manners at Theatre Royal, Drury Lane in 1775 (an adaptation of Ben Jonson's Eastward Ho). Finally, in 1790, she published Euphemia, her last novel, with little success, as the public's interest in novels of romance seemed to have waned. Euphemia is an epistolary novel set in New York State before the American Revolution.

Lennox had two children who survived infancy: Harriot Holles Lennox (1765–1802/4) and George Lewis Lennox (born 1771). She was estranged from her husband for many years, and they finally separated in 1793. Charlotte then lived in "solitary penury" for the rest of her life, relying on support from the Literary Fund. She died on 4 January 1804 in London and was buried in an unmarked grave at Broad Court Cemetery, Covent Garden.

During the 19th century, The Female Quixote remained moderately popular. In the 20th century, feminist scholars such as Janet Todd, Jane Spencer, and Nancy Armstrong have praised Lennox's skill and inventiveness.

Works

Poetry
Poems on Several Occasions (1747)
The Art of Coquetry (1750)
Birthday Ode to the Princess of Wales

Novels
The Life of Harriot Stuart (1751)
The Female Quixote (1752)
Henrietta (1758)
Sophia (1762)
Eliza (1766)
Euphemia (1790)
Hermione (1791)

Plays
Philander (1758)
The Sister (1769)
Old City Manners (1775)

Literary criticism
Shakespear [sic] Illustrated (1753–1754)

Periodical
The Lady's Museum (1760–1761)

Translations
1756 Memoirs of Maximilian de Bethune, Duke of Sully
1756 The Memoirs of the Countess of Berci
1757 Memoirs for the History of Madame de Maintenon and of the Last Age
1759 The Greek Theatre of Father Brumoy
1774 Meditations and Penitential Prayers by the Duchess de la Valière

References

Further reading

External links

Charlotte Lennox at the Eighteenth-Century Poetry Archive (ECPA)

The Sister
The Female Quixote free ebook in PDF, PDB and LIT formats
The Ladies Museum Project

1730 births
1804 deaths
Scottish women novelists
Scottish women poets
18th-century British writers
18th-century British women writers
18th-century Scottish novelists
Translators to English
Scottish women dramatists and playwrights
Scottish translators
Shakespearean scholars
18th-century Scottish dramatists and playwrights
18th-century Scottish writers
British parodists
Parody novelists